A sapper is an individual combat engineer soldier usually in British, Commonwealth, or U.S. military service.

Sapper may also refer to:

People
 Sapper (author), the pen name of Herman Cyril McNeile (1888–1937), British author
 Alan Sapper (1931–2006), British trade unionist, brother of Laurie Sapper
 Karl Sapper (1866–1945), German explorer and linguist who worked in Central America
 Laurie Sapper (1922–1989), British trade unionist, brother of Alan Sapper
 Richard Sapper (1932–2015), German industrial designer

Other
 Sapper army, a Soviet military construction engineer formation during World War II
 Sapper Hill, a mountain of East Falkland
 The Sapper VCs, a 1998 book by Colonel GWA Napier
 Sapper, a member of the Barksdale Organization on the TV series The Wire
 Sapper (application framework), an application framework powered by Svelte

See also
 
 Sapperton, New Westminster, a neighbourhood of British Columbia
 Sap (weapon), a weighted device used to subdue an individual through concussive trauma